The 37th San Miguel Beer (SMB) - Sportswriters Association of Cebu (SAC) Cebu Sports Awards is an annual awarding ceremony that recognized the triumphs and accomplishments of Cebuano sports personalities (athletes, coaches, teams and entities) in the past year, spearheaded by the medalists of the 2019 Southeast Asian Games hosted by the Philippines. The Cebu Sports Awards is the local counterpart of the yearly Philippine Sportswriters Association Annual Awards Night.

The awarding rites is organized by the Sportswriters Association of Cebu, an organization led by sportswriters and sports columnists from newspapers and online portals based in Cebu such as Sun.Star Cebu, The Freeman and Cebu Daily News Digital.

The event will take place on February 29, 2020 at the Northwing of the SM City Cebu in Cebu City.

Honor roll

Athlete of the Year
2018 Asian Games and 2019 Southeast Asian Games Gold Medalist Margielyn Didal was chosen by Cebu-based sportswriter as the Athlete of the Year, which was announced during the awarding ceremony.

Major awardees
The selection of the major awardees is based on their top achievements in the past year.

See also
2019 in Philippine sports
2020 PSA Annual Awards
Philippines at the 2019 Southeast Asian Games

References

SAC
SAC